is a Japanese actress, voice actress, gravure idol and singer. Her stage name is simply her given name, Saaya.

In addition to her modeling work she has recently been appearing in numerous films, radio, and television programs. She has also done voice work, appearing in the anime OVA Kyo no Gononi as Chika Koizumi. She was formerly a member of Japanese musical group Sweet Kiss before it disbanded on May 12, 2006, to be replaced by the group Chase.

Biography

As a model 
Irie was born in Kitakyushu, Fukuoka, Japan.  During her childhood she idolized Yoshika, a fashion model from Kitakyushu, but she gained fame for her professional glamour modeling as a U-15 idol, making her debut at age 11. Her bikini pictures soon received widespread distribution over the Internet. In October 2015, Saaya released her 12th photobook, and appeared in 44 solo gravure idol DVDs through 2017.

Personal life 
After making her debut as a model, she still lived in Fukuoka Prefecture where she attended elementary school and middle school, but moved to Tokyo when she turned 16. In August 2014, she contracted Dengue fever during the 2014 Dengue fever outbreak.

On May 20, 2022, she announced on both her Instagram and Twitter accounts that she is married and that she was pregnant with her first child. On September 30, she gave birth to a healthy baby girl.

Filmography

TV programs 
 Kyuyo Meisai (TV Tokyo)
 Gekito! Idol Yokibou (July 2006)
 Government Crime Investigation Agent Zaizen Jotaro (TV Asahi)
 Hell Girl (2007 Live action), Tsugumi Shibata (Nippon TV)
 Manga-Kissa Toshi-Densetsu Noroi no Manna san (BS-i)

Radio programs 
 Gekito! Idol Yokibou (Osaka Broadcasting Corporation, released in July 2006)

OVA 
 Kyo no Gononi (as Chika Koizumi; produced by avex)
 Note: She only sang for the Sweet Kiss version of the opening and ending songs and did not play Chika in the OVA itself. Mai Kadowaki played Chika. On the special edition of the DVD series there was a special audio track. Saaya and Chase were on the second audio track.

Films 
 God's Left Hand, Devil's Right Hand or Kami no hidarite Akuma no migite (神の左手　悪魔の右手) 2006
 Shibuya Kaidan parts 1 & 1 (渋谷 怪談 THEリアル都市伝説) 2006
 Kani Goalkeeper （かにゴールキーパー） 2006
 Carved or Kuchisake-onna (口裂け女) 2007 (all members of Chase in this movie)
 Pussy Soup (The Cat Cook) or Neko Râmen Taishô (猫ラーメン大将) 2008
 Hard Revenge Milly 2008
 Girl's Box 2008
 Yamagata sukurîm 2009
 Seifuku sabaigâru I 2010
 The Purple Mirror (horror) 2010
 Rock and Roll Diet 2010
 Yomutoshinu: Death Comic Part I and Part II (movie version) 2011
 Marry's Phone (Martial arts and horror) 2011

Web programs 
 It's your CHOICE! episode 2

Stage 
  (2015), Inahime

Discography

Chase 
 Chase Me! (1st single)

Sweet Kiss 
 Baby Love (opening to the anime OVA Kyo no Gononi)
 Yakusoku  (ending to the anime OVA Kyo no Gononi)

Sweet Kiss 
 Sweet Kiss (May 2005, Elk Heart Promotion) 
 Very Sweet Vol.2 (December 2005, Elk Heart Promotion)

Chase 
 激闘!アイドル予備校 紗綾・留奈・梨央 [Battle! Idol Prep-School – Saaya, Runa, Rio] (September 2006, E-Net Frontier)

References

External links 
   
 

1993 births
21st-century Japanese actresses
Japanese gravure models
Living people
People from Kitakyushu
Musicians from Fukuoka Prefecture